Megachile casadae is a species of bee in the family Megachilidae. It was described by Theodore Dru Alison Cockerell in 1898.

References

Casadae
Insects described in 1898